Cheney Longville is a small village in Shropshire, England.

It lies in the parish of Wistanstow, near to the small market town of Craven Arms.

It was called simply "Langfeld" in 1087, when it was owned by Shrewsbury Abbey. Roger de Cheney gave his name to the village around 1395 when he fortified the manor house - Cheney Longville Castle.

The River Onny and the A489 are to the immediate north. About a mile to the south is Sibdon Carwood.

See also
Listed buildings in Wistanstow

References
Shropshire tourism South Shropshire Villages

External links

Villages in Shropshire